LIFO (pronounced La-ee-fo) is a Greek weekly free-press/city guide published by DYO DEKA and distributed in selected spots in Athens and Thessaloniki.

It was created by journalist Stathis Tsagkarousianos in 2005 and its first issue was published in December of that year. 

LIFO.gr initially featured the contents of the magazine but has become a portal that includes news, features on current affairs, culture, a city guide, local news and videos.

History
The first issue was out in Athens and Thessaloniki on December 1, 2005. The word ATHINA was included in the logo for the first few issues.

Being a free city guide, it featured anything of value happening in the Greek capital and included opinions and interviews.

In 2007 the website LIFO.gr was created and apart from the contents of the print LIFO, it was updated daily with web only content from its writers. Its original concept included a vibrant community of bloggers who could create their own blog in the platform. In 2010, the site was upgraded and only selected bloggers could publish their material.

Content and style
LIFO is known for its alternative approach to cultural happenings, its progressive and tolerant view on social issues and the presentation of Athenian life. 

One of its longest-running and most popular columns is called The Athenians, where every week one acclaimed person is narrating the story of his/her life. 

Special publications of LIFO include issues with summer short-stories written exclusively for LIFO by some of the greatest Greek authors, an August magazine, issues on the Most Influential Greeks of each year, and issues that were fully curated by artists such as “Publishers for an Issue” Jean-Paul Gautier, Dimitris Papaioannou and Dionysis Savvopoulos.

Pluralism and tolerance in diverse opinions are the main characteristics of the site’s contents, as well as its anti-racist, anti-clerical and socially progressive stance.

References

External links

Official website
Facebook profile
Magazines published in Greece
Newspapers published in Greece